Will & Woody is a syndicated Australian radio show hosted by Will McMahon and Woody Whitelaw across the KIIS Network and Super Radio Network. The show in its current form first aired on the KIIS Network on 18 January 2018.

History

Hit Network 
McMahon and Whitelaw have hosted radio shows together since 2011, after being spotted by broadcaster Steve Vizard after performing at a law school revue in Melbourne. The pair were recruited as fill-in presenters for The Kyle & Jackie O Show, and were later heard nationally on the Today Network.

In October 2013, Southern Cross Austereo announced that McMahon and Whitelaw will host 92.9 Perth's breakfast radio program, alongside Heidi Anderson. In addition to their Perth shows, the pair were also heard on Fox FM Melbourne's Saturday breakfast program, between January and August 2017.

In August 2017, McMahon and Whitelaw departed Hit92.9 and its parent company, Southern Cross Austereo.

KIIS Network 
In October 2017, Australian Radio Network announced the pair would move to Melbourne to succeed the Hughesy & Kate drive show on the KIIS Network, commencing 8 January 2018. In February 2020, Australian Radio Network announced it had extended McMahon and Whitelaw's contract for three years.

In May 2022, the duo appeared as  contestants on the sixth season of The Celebrity Apprentice Australia. The duo placed 10th in the season, however still raised $20,000 for their chosen charity.

In June 2022, it was announced that Ash London will fill in for Will McMahon whilst he's on paternity leave.

From June 2022, the duo are the sideline commentators for Australian Ninja Warrior’s sixth season.

In January 2023, ARN announced that the show will be syndicated on the Super Radio Network to 16 additional radio stations across regional New South Wales, Queensland and the Northern Territory.

References

External links
 

Australian radio programs
2010s Australian radio programs
2020s Australian radio programs